Rustai-ye Deh Reza (also Romanized as Rūstāī-ye Deh Rez̤ā) is a village in Aliabad Rural District, in the Central District of Anbarabad County, Kerman Province, Iran. At the 2006 census, its population was 709, in 157 families.

References 

Populated places in Anbarabad County